Glendale is an unincorporated community and census-designated place (CDP) located in Forrest County, Mississippi, United States.

As of the 2020 census, Glendale had a population of 1,681.

Demographics 

As of the 2020 United States census, there were 1,681 people, 624 households, and 450 families residing in the CDP.

References

Census-designated places in Forrest County, Mississippi
Hattiesburg metropolitan area